Vinícius Santos Teixeira (born 3 April 1988) is a Brazilian handball player for Handebol Taubaté and the Brazilian national team.

Achievements
Pan American Men's Club Handball Championship:
2015, 2016, 2018
South and Central American Men's Club Handball Championship:2019, 2022''

Individual Awards and Achievements

Best Pivot
2016 Pan American Men's Club Handball Championship
2017 Pan American Men's Club Handball Championship
2022 South and Central American Men's Club Handball Championship

References

1988 births
People from Linhares
Brazilian male handball players
Pan American Games gold medalists for Brazil
Pan American Games silver medalists for Brazil
Pan American Games medalists in handball
Living people
Handball players at the 2011 Pan American Games
Handball players at the 2015 Pan American Games
Medalists at the 2015 Pan American Games
Medalists at the 2011 Pan American Games
Handball players at the 2020 Summer Olympics
Sportspeople from Espírito Santo
21st-century Brazilian people